The Boys from Fengkuei (also known as All the Youthful Days) is a 1983 film directed by Hou Hsiao-hsien.

Synopsis 
Ah-ching (Doze Niu) and his friends have just finished school in their island fishing village, Fengkuei, and now spend most of their time drinking and fighting. Ah-ching, together with Ah-rong (Chang Shih) and Kuo-tzu (Chao Peng-chue) decide to go to the port city of Kaohsiung to look for work. They find an apartment through relatives, and Ah-ching is attracted to Hsiao-hsing (Hsiu-ling Lin) the girlfriend of Huang Chin-ho (Tou Chung-hua), a neighbor. There they face the harsh realities of the big city and of growing up.

Awards
The film won the Golden Montgolfiere at the 1984 Nantes Three Continents Festival.

External links
 

1980s Mandarin-language films
1983 films
1983 drama films
Films directed by Hou Hsiao-hsien
Films shot in Penghu
Films set in Penghu
Films with screenplays by Chu T’ien-wen
Taiwanese drama films